The 2020 Caribbean Premier League (CPLT20) or for sponsorship reasons, Hero CPL 2020 was the eighth season of the Caribbean Premier League, the domestic Twenty20 cricket league  played in the West Indies. All matches were played in Trinidad and Tobago. The tournament started on 18 August and ended on 10 September 2020. On 10 July 2020, the local government gave its approval for the tournament to go ahead, with all the matches taking place at two venues behind closed doors. The full schedule for the tournament was confirmed on 27 July 2020. On 6 August 2020, an official press release stated that all players, officials and administrators involved in the league had tested negative on arrival ahead of a two weeks quarantine period.

Unlike the previous edition of the tournament, the playoffs had two semi-finals and a final, and not the eliminator matches, which gave teams two chances to reach the final. The Trinbago Knight Riders were the first team to qualify for the playoffs, and were joined by the St Lucia Zouks. The Guyana Amazon Warriors became the third team to reach the playoffs, after beating the St Lucia Zouks by seven wickets. On 3 September 2020, the Guyana Amazon Warriors beat the Barbados Tridents by six wickets. The result meant that the Barbados Tridents were eliminated from the tournament, with the Jamaica Tallawahs taking the fourth and final place in the playoffs. The Trinbago Knight Riders finished top of the group stage, winning all ten of their matches.

In the first semi-final, the Trinbago Knight Riders beat the Jamaica Tallawahs by nine wickets to advance to the final of the tournament. The St Lucia Zouks won their semi-final by 10 wickets, after the Guyana Amazon Warriors were bowled out for 55 runs, the second-lowest team total in the CPL. In the final, the Trinbago Knight Riders beat the St Lucia Zouks by eight wickets to win their fourth CPL title.

COVID-19 safety measures 
As per the agreement between the CPL and the Trinidad and Tobago government, all overseas players, team personnel, and other tournament personnel were required to self-isolate for two weeks before entering the country and two weeks after. All overseas players and personnel will be tested for COVID-19 before departure, 7 days after arrival, and 14 days after arrival. All overseas players and personnel have to enter Trinidad and Tobago no later than two weeks before the start of the tournament. Due to Trinidad and Tobago's lockdown rules, individuals may only enter the country on charter flights. The CPL organized a number of charter flights from various locations around the world to bring players to Trinidad and Tobago. Following their arrival, all overseas players and personnel will be staying in a bubble at the Hilton Hotel in Port-of-Spain and will only leave for CPL matches. Trinidad-based players and staff will be entering the bubble the week of 10 August following mandatory testing.

The St. Lucia Zouks and the Trinbago Knight Riders were the first teams allowed to start training, being able to do so from 11 August. On 12 August 2020, Ramnaresh Sarwan, the Jamaica Tallawahs assistant coach, left the bio-secure bubble due to personal reasons.

Squads
The following emerging and retained players were selected for the tournament, with the full squads named on 6 July 2020. At the age of 48, Pravin Tambe became the first Indian cricketer to get a contract in the Caribbean Premier League. Wahab Riaz (Tridents), Shoaib Malik (Amazon Warriors), and Shadab Khan (Amazon Warriors) were named in Pakistan's squad for their tour of England and therefore missed the CPL. Chris Gayle opted out of the CPL for personal reasons.

The COVID-19 pandemic and related travel restrictions resulted in some last minute squad changes. Imran Tahir of the Amazon Warriors was the only South African player to take part in the tournament, after the other five South African cricketers (Rassie van der Dussen (Patriots), Tabraiz Shamsi (Tallawahs), Anrich Nortje (Zouks), Rilee Rossouw (Zouks), Colin Ingram (Zouks)) failed to confirm travel arrangements in due time. Van der Dussen was replaced by Nick Kelly. Alex Hales and Harry Gurney, both of whom were in the Tridents' squad, withdrew from the tournament. Fabian Allen, who was playing for the Patriots, was ruled out of the tournament after missing his flight. The Patriots will not be naming a replacement for Allen. Dennis Bulli, who was in the Patriots' squad, withdrew from the tournament following a positive COVID-19 test and was replaced by Imran Khan. Afghans Qais Ahmad (Amazon Warriors), Rahmanullah Gurbaz (Tridents) and Noor Ahmad (Zouks) withdrew due to visa issues. Marcus Stoinis (Tridents) and Sunny Sohal (Patriots) withdrew due to COVID-19 concerns. The Tallawahs withdrew Andre McCarthy and Jeavor Royal because they came in contact with a player who tested positive for COVID-19. Corey Anderson (Tridents), Mitchell Santner (Tridents), Shamarh Brooks (Tridents), Keon Harding (Tridents), Kissoondath Magram (Amazon Warriors), Mujeeb Ur Rahman (Tallawahs), Jermaine Blackwood (Tallawahs), Ramaal Lewis (Tallawahs), Jahmar Hamilton (Patriots), Roston Chase (Zouks), Zahir Khan (Zouks), Scott Kuggeleijn (Zouks), and Najibullah Zadran (Zouks) were brought in as replacement players. Cricket West Indies confirmed the revised squads for the tournament on 18 August 2020.

Venues
The Brian Lara Cricket Academy hosted the first ten and the last ten league matches, along with all the matches in the playoffs. The remaining fixtures took place at Queen's Park Oval.

Points table

  advanced to the Playoffs

League stage

Playoffs

Semi final 1

Semi final 2

Final

Statistics

Most runs

 Source: Cricinfo

Most wickets

 Source: Cricinfo

References

External links
 Series home at ESPN Cricinfo

Caribbean Premier League
Caribbean Premier League